Deorwine is an ancient Anglo-Saxon and Old English name, with newer (current-day) variants Darwin, Derwin, etc., used as both a given name and surname. One modern appearance of the name is in J. R. R. Tolkien's fantasy fiction books as Déorwine.

See also
Darwin (given name)

References

English-language masculine given names